Reizei family (冷泉家, Reizei-ke) is a Japanese kuge (court noble) family from Kyoto. It is a branch of the Fujiwara clan, with a long poetic tradition.

History 

The Reizei family descended from Fujiwara no Michinaga through his sixth son, Nagaie (1005-1064); this line was known by the name of Mikohidari until Tamesuke took the name of Reizei. Nagaie's second son Tadaie (1033-1091) had a second son, Toshitada (1071-1123), whose fourth son Toshinari (also known as Fujiwara no Shunzei, 1114-1204) had a second son, Sadaie (also known as Fujiwara no Teika, 1162-1241), whose third son Tameie (1198-1275) was Reizei Tamesuke's father.

The present (25th generation) head of the senior line of the family is Reizei Tamehito (born 1944).

For eight centuries, the family secretly preserved, under imperial order, an important collection of documents. On April 4, 1980, this collection of about 200,000 pieces was made public by Tametou Reizei (1914-1986). The following year, a library in Tokyo was created specially for their conservation. Not all of the documents have yet been identified, but certain ones have already been classified as national treasures. 

The Reizei residence is located to the north side of Kyoto Imperial Palace, and is the last extant original court noble residence in Kyoto. It was registered as an Important Cultural Property.

Heads of the Reizei family 

1- Reizei Tamesuke (1263-1328)

2- Reizei Tamehide (d. 1372)

3- Reizei Tamemasa (1361-1417)

4- Reizei Tameyuki (1393-1439)

5- Reizei Tametomi

6- Reizei Tamehiro (1450-1526)

7- Reizei Tamekazu (1486-1549)

8- Reizei Tamemasu (1516-1570)

9- Reizei Tamemitsu (1559-1619)

10- Reizei Tameyori

11- Reizei Tameharu

12- Reizei Tamekiyo

13- Reizei Tametsuna

14- Reizei Tamehisa (1686-1741)

15- Reizei Tamemura (1712-1774)

16- Reizei Tameyasu

17- Reizei Tamefumi (1752-1822)

18- Reizei Tamenori

19- Reizei Tametake

20- Reizei Tametada (1824-1885)

21- Reizei Tamemoto (1854-1905)

22- Reizei Tametsugi (1881-1946)

23- Reizei Tameomi (d. 1944)

24- Reizei Tametou (1914-1986)

25- Reizei Tamehito (1944-)

References 
  Louis Frédéric, Le Japon, dictionnaire et civilisation, Paris: Robert Laffont, coll. «Bouquins», 1996. 
 JSTOR article
 Steven D. Carter, Householders: The Reizei Family in Japanese History (Cambridge, MA, Harvard University Press, 2007) (Harvard-Yenching Institute monograph series, 61).
 Takie Sugiyama Lebra, Above the Clouds: Status Culture of the Modern Japanese Nobility (University of California Press, 1993)

''This article is based on a translation of the corresponding article in the French Wikipedia.

External links 
 https://www3.nhk.or.jp/nhkworld/en/tv/corekyoto/20210218/2029149/

Fujiwara clan
Japanese families